Johan Franciscus Schønheyder (25 August 1879 – 4 December 1968) was a Norwegian ships engineer.

Personal life 
Schønheyder was born in Christiania to stipendiary magistrate Didrik Christian Sommerschild Schønheyder and Marie Katinka Maurer. He married Anna Kristine Schjold in 1914. He was the father of Johan Chr. Schønheyder.

Career

Schønheyder studied engineering in Kristiania and Hannover. He worked as ships engineer in Glasgow and Trondheim, and was assigned at the Ministry of Trade from 1918 to 1949. From 1949 to 1953 he worked for Nortraship. He was decorated Knight, First Class of the Swedish Order of Vasa.

References

1879 births
1968 deaths
Engineers from Oslo
Norwegian expatriates in Germany
Norwegian expatriates in Scotland
Nortraship people
Knights of the Order of Vasa